Båtsfjord is the administrative centre of Båtsfjord Municipality in Troms og Finnmark county, Norway. The village sits at the northern end of Norwegian County Road 891. The Båtsfjord Airport lies just south of the village. The Hurtigruten coastal express has regular stops at Båtsfjord.

The village is home to about 98% of all the residents in the entire municipality (there are 2,267 residents in Båtsfjord Municipality in 2017).

Båtsfjord is one of the biggest fishing ports in Finnmark county with around 10,000 boat arrivals each year. The village also has a number of facilities for fish processing.  

Båtsfjord has shopping facilities, a post office, a school, and Båtsfjord Church.

History
Historically, there were three whaling stations in Båtsfjord, but they are no longer in operation.

References

Villages in Finnmark
Båtsfjord
Populated places of Arctic Norway